James J. Abeler II (born May 18, 1954) is a Minnesota politician and member of the Minnesota Senate. A member of the Republican Party of Minnesota, he represents District 35 in the northern Twin Cities metropolitan area. He formerly represented District 35A in the Minnesota House of Representatives.

Early life and education
Abeler was born in Minneapolis. He graduated from Anoka High School in Anoka, then attended the University of Minnesota and Hamline University in Saint Paul. He earned his D.C. from Northwestern College of Chiropractic in Bloomington in 1979. In the late 1990s, he founded PACT Charter School in Anoka.

Minnesota Legislature

Minnesota House of Representatives
Abeler was first elected to the Minnesota House of Representatives in 1998 and was reelected every two years since then until retiring in 2014. Before the 2002 legislative redistricting, he represented the old District 49A. He chaired the Health Policy and Finance Subcommittee for the Health Care Cost Containment Division during the 2005-06 biennium.

Minnesota Senate

Abeler was elected to the Minnesota Senate in a special election on February 9, 2016 and took office on February 22. He was noted for not realizing that he approved a DFL-sponsored bill that legalized in Minnesota THC edibles derived from hemp.

2014 U.S. Senate campaign

Abeler was a candidate in the 2014 U.S. Senate election in Minnesota. He lost the Republican nomination to Mike McFadden.

Political stances
Abeler formed the MN Autism Council in 2018. He was subsequently criticized for appointing Wayne Rohde, cofounder of the Vaccine Safety Council of Minnesota, to the council in 2019. Rohde is a prominent vaccine skeptic and an executive for Health Choice, which advocates for health conditions in children "caused by side effects of vaccine choices."

During the COVID-19 pandemic, in November 2020, Abeler opened a bar called Nucky's Speakeasy as a co-owner. He had owned the Anoka building in which it opened since 1994. The bar was named after Atlantic City racketeer Enoch Lewis "Nucky" Johnson.

Personal life
Abeler is married to Barb and they have six children. He is a Baptist and a chiropractor.

References

External links

 Official Senate website
 Official campaign website
 
 Issue positions and quotes at On the Issues
 Minnesota Public Radio Votetracker: Rep. Jim Abeler

1954 births
Living people
Republican Party members of the Minnesota House of Representatives
Republican Party Minnesota state senators
People from Anoka, Minnesota
University of Minnesota alumni
21st-century American politicians
Northwestern Health Sciences University alumni